The 1990 Colgate Red Raiders football team was an American football team that represented Colgate University during the 1990 NCAA Division I-AA football season. Colgate tied for second in the newly renamed Patriot League. 

In its third season under head coach Michael Foley, the team compiled a 7–4 record. Dave Goodwin and Rick Krichbaum were the team captains. 

The Red Raiders outscored opponents 296 to 248. Their 3–2 conference record placed them in a three-way tie for second place in the six-team Patriot League standings. This was the first year of competition under the Patriot League banner; the league had been known as the Colonial League since 1986.

The team played its home games at Andy Kerr Stadium in Hamilton, New York.

Schedule

References

Colgate
Colgate Raiders football seasons
Colgate Red Raiders football